Allegheny, Alleghany or Allegany may refer to:

Places

Geologic and geographic features 
 Allegheny River, in Pennsylvania and New York
 Allegheny Mountains, part of the Appalachian Mountain Range in West Virginia, Pennsylvania, Maryland and Virginia
Allegheny Mountain (Pennsylvania), major mountain ridge in the northern part of the Allegheny Mountains
Little Allegheny Mountain, in Pennsylvania and Maryland; see list of mountains of the Alleghenies
Allegheny Mountain (West Virginia–Virginia), major mountain ridge in the southern part of the Allegheny Mountains
Back Allegheny Mountain, in West Virginia
 Allegheny Plateau, which terminates in the east at the Allegheny Mountains
 Allegheny Front, the escarpment delineating the eastern edge of the Allegheny Plateau 
 Allegheny Formation, a mapped bedrock unit of West Virginia, Maryland and Pennsylvania

Counties
Allegany County, Maryland
Allegany County, New York
Alleghany County, North Carolina
Alleghany County, Virginia
Allegheny County, Pennsylvania

Communities and townships
 Alleghany, California, unincorporated community in Sierra County
 Allegheny, Kentucky
 Allegheny, Pennsylvania, a city annexed by the city of Pittsburgh in 1907
 Allegheny Township, Blair County, Pennsylvania
 Allegheny Township, Butler County, Pennsylvania
 Allegheny Township, Cambria County, Pennsylvania
 Allegheny Township, Somerset County, Pennsylvania
 Allegheny Township, Venango County, Pennsylvania
 Allegheny Township, Westmoreland County, Pennsylvania

Protected areas
 Allegheny National Forest, Pennsylvania
 Allegheny National Recreation Area, Pennsylvania
 Allegheny Wildlife Management Area, in Mineral County, West Virginia
 High Allegheny National Park and Preserve, a proposed NPS unit in West Virginia

Man-made features
 Allegheny Cabin (Rohrbaugh Cabin), historic structure in eastern West Virginia
 Allegheny Observatory, at the University of Pittsburgh
 Allegheny Mountain Tunnel, a vehicular tunnel on the Pennsylvania Turnpike
 Allegheny Reservoir, a reservoir on the Allegheny River
 Allegheny River Tunnel, a light rail tunnel under the Allegheny River in Pittsburgh
 Trans-Allegheny Lunatic Asylum, a former psychiatric hospital turned tourist attraction in West Virginia

Trails
 Allegheny Trail, a hiking trail in West Virginia
 Great Allegheny Passage including parts in Maryland and Pennsylvania
 Allegheny Highlands Trail of Maryland, a rail trail

Rail
 Allegheny (train), a passenger train operated by the Pennsylvania Railroad
 Allegheny Railroad, a railroad operating in northwestern Pennsylvania (1985–92)
 Allegheny station (disambiguation), stations of the name
 Allegheny Valley Railroad, a railroad operating in Western Pennsylvania since 1992
 Allegheny Valley Street Railway, an electric rail line operating along the Allegheny River (1906–37)
 Allegheny class, a class of 2-6-6-6 locomotives

Organizations
 Alleghany Corp., an insurance holding company
 Allegheny Airlines, a forerunner of US Airways
 Allegheny College, in Meadville, Pennsylvania
 Allegheny Energy, a public utility (including its subsidiary Allegheny Power)
 Allegheny Foundation, a charitable organization focused on Western Pennsylvania
 Allegheny Mountain Radio, a network of radio stations in West Virginia and Virginia
 Allegheny Technologies, a specialty metals company
 Allegheny (titular see), a Roman Catholic titular see
 Pittsburgh Allegheny (International Association), a nineteenth century minor league baseball team that, at times, played under the name "Allegheny"

Biology
 Pachysandra procumbens or Allegheny pachysandra, a plant in the box family
 Allegheny woodrat, a species of pack rat in the eastern US
 Allegheny Mountain dusky salamander, a species of the eastern US and Canada
 Allegheny mound ant, a species of the eastern US and Canada
 "Allegheny alligator", nickname for the hellbender
 Allegheny chinquapin (Castanea pumila), a species of chestnut

See also
 
 
 Allegany (disambiguation)